An inquisitor was an official in an Inquisition led by the Roman Catholic Church.

Inquisitor may also refer to:

Fictional characters
 Imperial Inquisitor, fictional characters within Star Wars who are force-sensitive beings that work for Darth Vader and form Emperor Palpatine's Inquisitorius
 Grand Inquisitor (Star Wars), a fictional character from Star Wars Rebels and leader of the Inquisitorius in the Star Wars Expanded Universe.
 Inquisitor (Doctor Who), a Time Lord featured throughout the twenty-third season of Doctor Who.
 The Inquisitor (Red Dwarf), the title character of the Red Dwarf episode of the same name.
 The Inquisitor, a character from Warhammer 40,000: Inquisitor – Martyr.
 The Inquisitor, the player character in Dragon Age: Inquisition.

Biology
 Inquisitor (genus), a sea snail genus in the family Pseudomelatomidae
 Calosoma inquisitor, a ground beetle species found in northern Africa, Europe and Asia

Software
 Inquisitor (hardware testing software), a Linux-based diagnostic software suite
 Inquisitor (search software), a search tool for Safari, Firefox, Internet Explorer and iPhone

Others
 Inquisitor (game), a tabletop game set in the fictional Warhammer 40,000 universe
 Inquisitor (magazine), a game magazine published by Armorcast about Warhammer 40,000 
 Inquisitor (video game), a 2009 role-playing game developed by Cinemax
 "The Inquisitor" (Red Dwarf), an episode of the TV series, or the episode's title character
 The Inquisitor, an alternate title for the 1990 film The Pit and the Pendulum
 "Inquisitor", a song by Raven from All for One
 Inquisitorial system, a legal system where the court or a part of the court is actively involved in determining the facts of the case

See also
 Grand Inquisitor, the lead official of the Inquisition
 "The Grand Inquisitor", a parable related in Fyodor Dostoevsky's novel The Brothers Karamazov
 Inquisitr, an aggregate news and media website